No Great Lost: Songs, 1979–1985 is an anthology of songs recorded by Atlanta-based singer-songwriter Kevin Dunn between 1979 and 1985, including the entirety of his critically acclaimed 1981 album The Judgment of Paris, originally released on DB Records. In The Trouser Press Record Guide, critic Ira Robbins described The Judgment of Paris as "a striking modern-music pop album" that "mixes technical flash with semi-demented musical ideas."

This 21 track compilation also includes three songs from the 1983 EP C'est toujours la meme guitare (Press Records), four from the 1985 LP Tanzfeld (Press Records), both sides of a 1979 45-rpm single, and one song from Dunn's 1970s post-punk band The Fans, "Cars and Explosions." It was released May 18, 2010, on Casa Nueva Records.

Track listing

References

External links 
 trouserpress.com
 criticalmob.com

New wave compilation albums
2010 compilation albums
Kevin Dunn (musician) albums